Dylan John Jones OBE  (born 1960) is an English journalist and author. He served as editor of the UK version of men's fashion and lifestyle magazine GQ from 1999 to 2021. He has held senior roles with several other publications, including editor of magazines i-D and Arena, and has contributed weekly columns to newspapers The Independent and The Mail on Sunday. Jones has penned multiple books.

Education and early career
Jones was born in Ely, Cambridgeshire. He attended Chelsea School of Art and then Saint Martin's School of Art in London where he studied graphic design, film and photography.  He began his career in journalism at i-D magazine in 1983, becoming Editor in 1984 before moving to Arena in 1987 to serve as Editor. At that same time, he was also a Contributing Editor at The Face, writing cover stories on individuals including Jean Paul Gaultier and Neneh Cherry. Following that, he worked as associate editor of The Observer magazine when it was relaunched with Simon Kelner in 1992, and then moved to The Sunday Times where he held various positions.

GQ
In 1999, Jones moved to Condé Nast and took over GQ.  He is credited with bringing in a roster of high-quality writers, including Dominic Lawson, Will Self, A.A. Gill, Ed Victor and Tom Wolfe, as well as taking the magazine in a more political direction. He hired Boris Johnson as the magazine's car correspondent. GQ was also the first magazine to feature David Cameron on its cover, soon after he became leader of the Conservative Party.

Since Jones joined GQ, the magazine has won 34 awards. Having won the BSME Men's Editor of the Year Award six times during his tenure at GQ, Jones was also recognised for the Brand Building Initiative of the Year 2007 for the annual GQ Men of the Year Awards. At the BSME Awards 2012, he received the Mark Boxer Award for lifetime achievement, honouring him not only for his work on GQ but for his entire career in journalism.

Jones was appointed Officer of the Order of the British Empire (OBE) in the 2013 Birthday Honours for services to the publishing and British fashion industries.

Other roles
Jones had a weekly column in the magazine supplement of The Mail on Sunday.

In 2010, Jones collaborated with David Bailey on British Heroes in Afghanistan, a celebration of British fighting heroes in Afghanistan, both inside Camp Bastion and outside, with sales benefiting the charity Help for Heroes. Jones is Vice President of Hay Festival, and is also co-chair of the 2011 Norman Mailer Benefit Gala Dinner, being held in New York City. He was Chairman of the Prince's Trust's Fashion Rocks Monaco, in 2007 and, in 2012, was appointed the Chair of the 2012 Menswear Committee by the British Fashion Council, helping to organise Britain's first London Collections: Men.

Books
Jones has written biographies of musician Jim Morrison and fashion designer Paul Smith and two anthologies of journalism. He is the author of the book, iPod Therefore I Am: A Personal Journey Through Music documenting his musical tastes and how the iPod music player has transformed it. His book Mr Jones' Rules for the Modern Man is an etiquette guide containing advice on how a modern man should behave. It has since been published in 15 countries. Published in August 2008 by Fourth Estate, Cameron on Cameron: Conversations with Dylan Jones was based on a series of interviews with the Conservative Party leader over the course of a year. It was shortlisted for the Channel 4 Political Book of The Year.

In 2012, Jones wrote three books, When Ziggy Played Guitar: David Bowie and Four Minutes that Shook the World, The Biographical Dictionary of Popular Music and From the Ground Up: U2 360° Tour Official Photobook. The following year, Jones wrote The Eighties: One Day, One Decade, which was published by Preface Publishing in June 2013. The book is partly autobiographical and partly cultural and political history which charts the story of the Eighties through Live Aid in 1985.

Politics
In 2018, Jones wrote for The Guardian, "Though in 2008 I 'came out' as a Tory, today I wouldn't describe myself as a Conservative." He described "the thought of Jacob Rees-Mogg being taken seriously by the electorate" as "frightening" but was more critical of Labour leader Jeremy Corbyn, saying his attitude to antisemitism in the party was "insulting". Jones was a prominent supporter of the London Garden Bridge Project. In 2017, he expressed criticism of Jeremy Corbyn and his demeanour during a British GQ cover shoot.

Bibliography

Books
Jim Morrison: Dark Star, Bloomsbury, September 1990.
Paul Smith True Brit, 1995.
Meaty, Beaty, Big & Bouncy and Sex, Power and Travel both anthologies 1996. 
iPod, Therefore I Am, Weidenfeld & Nicolson, June 2005.
Mr Jones' Rules for the Modern Man, Hodder & Stoughton, October 2006.
Cameron on Cameron: Conversations with Dylan Jones, Fourth Estate, August 2008.
Heroes, by Jones and David Bailey, Thames & Hudson, October 2010.*
When Ziggy Played Guitar: David Bowie and Four Minutes that Shook the World, Preface Publishing, 2012.
The Biographical Dictionary of Popular Music, Bedford Square Books, 2012
From the Ground Up: U2 360° Tour Official Photobook, Preface Publishing, 2012.
 The Eighties: One Day, One Decade, Preface Publishing, June 2013

David Bowie: A Life, Crown Archetype, 2017.
The Wichita Lineman: Searching in the Sun for the World's Greatest Unfinished Song, Faber & Faber, July 2019.
Sweet Dreams: The Story of the New Romantics, Faber and Faber, 2020.

Essays and reporting

Critical studies and reviews of Jones' work
 Review of Elvis has left the building.

References

External links
Edition.cnn.com
IMDb.com
Tvlives.com
Orionbooks.co.uk
Guardian.co.uk
GQ-magazine.co.uk
Timesonline.co.uk

1960 births
Alumni of Chelsea College of Arts
Alumni of Saint Martin's School of Art
British magazine editors
Living people
Officers of the Order of the British Empire
People from Ely, Cambridgeshire